What Happened to Harkness? is a 1934 British comedy film directed by Milton Rosmer and starring Robert Hale, James Finlayson and Brember Wills. It was made at Teddington Studios.

Premise
The murder of a miser is investigated by a village policeman.

Cast
 Robert Hale as Sergeant McCabe  
 James Finlayson as Police Constable Gallun  
 Brember Wills as Bernard Harkness  
 John Turnbull as Inspector Marlow  
 Clare Harris as Mrs. Millett  
 Wally Patch as Bullett  
 Morland Graham as Billy  
 Veronica Brady as Mrs. Bullett  
 Aubrey Mallalieu as Dr. Powin  
 Kathleen Kelly as Pat

References

Bibliography
 Low, Rachael. Filmmaking in 1930s Britain. George Allen & Unwin, 1985.
 Wood, Linda. British Films, 1927-1939. British Film Institute, 1986.

External links

1934 films
British comedy films
1934 comedy films
Films directed by Milton Rosmer
Films shot at Teddington Studios
British black-and-white films
1930s English-language films
1930s British films